Hellenhahn-Schellenberg is a municipality in Westerwaldkreis, Rhineland-Palatinate, Germany.

References 

Municipalities in Rhineland-Palatinate
Westerwaldkreis